Princess Charoensri Chanamayu or Phra Chao Boromwongse Ther Phra Ong Chao Charoensri Chanamayu (RTGS: Charoensi Chonmayu) (31 March 1878 – 24 December 1916), was a Princess of Siam (later Thailand). She was a member of Siamese Royal Family. She was the daughter of Chulalongkorn, King Rama V of Siam.

Her mother was The Noble Consort (Chao Chom Manda) Saeng Galyanamitra (daughter of Phraya Jayavichit, granddaughter of Chao Phraya Nikara Bodindra (Toh) who built Galyanamitra Temple). Princess Charoensri Chanamayu had 3 full siblings; 2 elder brothers and 1 elder sister;
 Prince Isaravongs Vorarajakumara (4 September 1870 – 5 June 1872)
 Prince Nabhanka Nibandhabongs (8 August 1874 – 17 September 1876)
 Princess Beatrice Bhadrayuvadi (5 December 1876 – 30 September 1913)

Princess Charoensri Chanamayu died 24 December 1916 at age of only 38.

Ancestry

1878 births
1916 deaths
19th-century Thai women
20th-century Thai women
19th-century Chakri dynasty
20th-century Chakri dynasty
Thai female Phra Ong Chao
Dames Grand Commander of the Order of Chula Chom Klao
Children of Chulalongkorn
Daughters of kings